The Albuquerque Silvers were an American basketball team based in Albuquerque, New Mexico, which was a member of the Continental Basketball Association (CBA). The team was coached by Norm Ellenberger, the former coach of the University of New Mexico men's basketball team. The franchise was run by P. Patrick McKernan who was also the president and general manager of the Pacific Coast League Albuquerque Dukes.

The team was previously known as the Las Vegas Silvers, but was re-located to Albuquerque on February 10, 1983 by the CBA after the team owners failed to meet their financial obligation to the league. According to the CBA, Silvers owners Patrick Shimbashi and Ken Ford—who together owned 90 percent of the team—could not agree on a way to fund the team.

Year-by-year with Alberta Dusters

Year-by-year with Las Vegas Silvers

Year-by-year with Albuquerque Silvers

References

Sports in Albuquerque, New Mexico
Defunct basketball teams in the United States
Basketball teams in New Mexico
Basketball teams established in 1983
1983 establishments in New Mexico
Basketball teams disestablished in 1985
1985 disestablishments in New Mexico